Mats Jonsson (born November 28, 1957) is a rally driver from Sweden. He competed in the World Rally Championship from 1984 to 1993, with a best position of 12th overall in the 1991 season.. His greatest individual events were in his home Swedish Rally, which he won outright in successive years in 1992 and 1993. He has won the Swedish rally championship 17 times

He continues to compete in Scandinavian events, and in both the European and Estonian Rally Championships, in a Group A Ford Escort.

WRC victories
{|class="wikitable"
! # 
!Event
!Season
!Co-driver
!Car
|-
| 1
|  41st International Swedish Rally
| 1992
| Lars Bäckman
| Toyota Celica GT-Four ST165
|-
| 2
|  42nd International Swedish Rally
| 1993
| Lars Bäckman
| Toyota Celica Turbo 4WD
|}

References

External links
 Mats Jonsson Motorsport, official site
 Profile of Mats Jonsson at World Rally Archive
 Profile of Mats Jonsson at Rallybase

1957 births
Swedish rally drivers
Living people
Toyota Gazoo Racing drivers
World Rally Championship drivers